Juan Roco Campofrío (8 June 1565 – 16 September 1635) was a Roman Catholic prelate who served as Bishop of Coria (1632–1635), Bishop of Badajoz (1627–1632), and Bishop of Zamora (1625–1627).

Biography
Juan Roco Campofrío was born in Alcántara, Spain and ordained a priest in the Order of Saint Benedict. On 17 March 1625, he was appointed during the papacy of Pope Urban VIII as Bishop of Zamora. On 29 June 1625, he was consecrated bishop by Giulio Cesare Sacchetti, Bishop of Gravina, with Juan Bravo Lagunas, Bishop of Ugento, and Antonio de Gouvea, Titular Bishop of Cyrene, serving as co-consecrators. On 5 July 1627, he was appointed during the papacy of Pope Urban VIII as Bishop of Badajoz. On 8 March 1632, he was appointed during the papacy of Pope Urban VIII as Bishop of Coria. He served as Bishop of Coria until his death on 16 September 1635.

See also
Catholic Church in Spain

References

External links and additional sources
 (for Chronology of Bishops) 
 (for Chronology of Bishops) 
 (for Chronology of Bishops) 
 (for Chronology of Bishops) 
 (for Chronology of Bishops) 
 (for Chronology of Bishops) 

17th-century Roman Catholic bishops in Spain
Bishops appointed by Pope Urban VIII
1565 births
1635 deaths
Benedictine bishops